Yasnaya Polyana is a rural locality (a village) in Kaltasinsky Selsoviet, Kaltasinsky District, Bashkortostan, Russia. The population was 54 as of 2010. There is 1street.

Geography 
Yasnaya Polyana is located 3 km north of Kaltasy (the district's administrative centre) by road. Kaltasy is the nearest rural locality.

References 

Rural localities in Kaltasinsky District